Bocheniec refers to the following places in Poland:

 Bocheniec, Kuyavian-Pomeranian Voivodeship
 Bocheniec, Świętokrzyskie Voivodeship